Çınarlı railway station was a station in İzmir, Turkey, abandoned in 2001. It was serviced by suburban trains from Basmane station to Çiğli. The station was located at a former grade crossing of 1561 Street, just northeast of Halkapınar station and consisted of two side platforms. The station was closed down in 2001 and demolished shortly after. The southbound platform site was used for the construction of a new third track, to allow freight trains from the Port of İzmir to enter the railway further north.

References

Railway stations closed in 2001
Railway stations in İzmir Province
2001 disestablishments in Turkey
Defunct railway stations in Turkey
Konak District